Gelechia sestertiella is a moth of the family Gelechiidae. It was described by Gottlieb August Wilhelm Herrich-Schäffer in 1854. It is found in Norway, Sweden, Finland, France, Germany, Denmark, Italy, Austria, Switzerland, the Czech Republic, Slovakia, Hungary, the Baltic region, Ukraine, Belarus and Russia.

The wingspan is 13–14 mm. Adults have been recorded on wing from July to August.

The larvae feed on Acer platanoides and Acer campestre.

References

Moths described in 1854
Gelechia
Moths of Europe